Maksim Yuryevich Nedasekau (born 21 January 1998) is a Belarusian athlete specialising in the high jump. He was the bronze medallist at the 2020 Olympic Games. He also won the gold medals at the 2021 European Indoor Championships, 2019 European U23 Championships and 2017 European U20 Championships.

In 2019, he won the silver medal in the team event at the 2019 European Games.

His personal bests are 2.37 metres outdoors (2020 Olympic Games) and 2.37 metres indoors (Toruń 2021).

International competitions

References

1998 births
Living people
Belarusian male high jumpers
Athletes (track and field) at the 2019 European Games
European Games medalists in athletics
European Games gold medalists for Belarus
European Games silver medalists for Belarus
Sportspeople from Vitebsk
European Athletics Indoor Championships winners
Athletes (track and field) at the 2020 Summer Olympics
Medalists at the 2020 Summer Olympics
Olympic bronze medalists in athletics (track and field)
Olympic bronze medalists for Belarus
Olympic athletes of Belarus